Godogani may refer to the following places in Georgia:

Godogani, Imereti, a village in Terjola Municipality
Godogani, Samegrelo-Zemo Svaneti, a village in Martvili Municipality